Wadi Rum ( Wādī Ramm, also Wādī al-Ramm), known also as the Valley of the Moon ( Wādī al-Qamar), is a valley cut into the sandstone and granite rock in southern Jordan, near the border to Saudi Arabia and about  to the east of the city of Aqaba. With an area of  it is the largest wadi in Jordan.

Several prehistoric civilizations left petroglyphs, rock inscriptions and ruins in Wadi Rum. Today it is a tourist attraction, offering guided tours, hiking and rock climbing. The Wadi Rum Protected Area has been a UNESCO World Heritage site since 2011.

Name
Wadi Rum or Wadi Ramm is believed to get its name from the early name of Iram of the Pillars (also called Irum), a lost city mentioned in the Quran.

History

Wadi Rum has been inhabited by many human cultures since prehistoric times, with many cultures–including the Nabataeans–leaving their mark in the form of petroglyphs, inscriptions, and temple ruins.

In the West, Wadi Rum may be best known for its connection with British officer T. E. Lawrence, who passed through several times during the Arab Revolt of 1917–18.  In the 1980s one of the rock formations in Wadi Rum, originally known as "Jabal al-Mazmar" (The Mountain of (the) Plague), was named "The Seven Pillars of Wisdom," after Lawrence's book penned in the aftermath of the war, though the 'Seven Pillars' referred to in the book have no connection with Rum.

Lawrence described his entrance into the Valley of Rumm: "The hills on the right grew taller and sharper, a fair counterpart of the other side which straightened itself to one massive rampart of redness. They drew together until only two miles divided them: and then, towering gradually till their parallel parapets must have been a thousand feet above us, ran forward in an avenue for miles. The crags were capped in nests of domes, less hotly red than the body of the hill; rather grey and shallow. They gave the finishing semblance of Byzantine architecture to this irresistible place: this processional way greater than imagination."

Lawrence also described his encounter with the spring, Ain Shalaaleh, "On the rock-bulge above were clear-cut Nabathaean inscriptions, and a sunk panel incised with a monogram or symbol. Around and about were Arab scratches, including tribe-marks, some of which were witnesses of forgotten migrations: but my attention was only for the splashing of water in a crevice under the shadow of the overhanging rock. I looked in to see the spout, a little thinner than my wrist, jetting out firmly from a fissure in the roof, and falling with that clean sound into a shallow, frothing pool, behind the step which served as an entrance.  Thick ferns and grasses of the finest green made it a paradise just five feet square."

The discovery of the Nabataean Temple (located walking distance from the Rest House) in 1933 briefly returned the spotlight to the desert. A French team of archaeologists completed the excavations in 1997.

Geography
The area is centered on the main valley of Wadi Rum. On a clear day, it is possible to see the Red Sea and the Saudi border from the top.

Jabal Ram or Jebel Rum ( above sea level) is the second highest peak in Jordan and the highest peak in the central Rum, rising directly above Rum valley, opposite Jebel um Ishrin, which is possibly one meter lower.

Khaz'ali Canyon in Wadi Rum is the site of petroglyphs etched into the cave walls depicting humans and antelopes dating back to the Thamudic times. The village of Wadi Rum itself consists of several hundred Bedouin inhabitants with their goat-hair tents and concrete houses and also their four-wheel vehicles, one school for boys and one for girls, a few shops, and the headquarters of the Desert Patrol.

Recently, Geoff Lawton has achieved success in establishing a permaculture ecosystem in Wadi Rum.

Geology

Located in the Sandstone Mountain and Valley Region of southern Jordan, Wadi Rum is characterized by tall, near vertical mountains of iron-rich, erosion resistant,  Umm Ishrin Sandstone, separated by flat-bottom valleys of alluvial sediments, aeolian sands, and salt pans.  The Umm Ishrin is the thickest formation in the Lower Palaeozoic-Upper Cretaceous Nubian Sandstone, underlying the Disi and Umm Sahn sandstone formations, and overlying the Salib Arkosic Formation. The Salib in turn overlies the eroded Aqaba Complex of plutonic granitoids. An aquifer forms along this lithologic contact, with springs forming on the eastern mountain slopes.  Alluvial fans compose most of the alluvial sediments. Aeolian systems include tafoni, natural bridges, and sand dunes. Sand dunes include barkhans, climbing dunes consisting of sand ramps that reach the tops of hills, and echo dunes consisting of sands that have crawled over a hill to be deposited on the lee side.

Tourism
Desert scenes of Wadi Rum in Lawrence of Arabia from 1962 kick-started Jordan's tourism industry.

Wadi Rum is one of Jordan's most popular tourist sites and attracts a monthly average of 9,860 tourists from around the world. Wadi Rum is home to the Zalabieh tribe, who developed eco-adventure tourism and services throughout the protected area. They provide tours, guides, accommodation and facilities. They also run restaurants and small shops in the villages that provide meals and basic supplies for visitors. Their guide services include highly experienced mountain and trekking guides who have an unmatched knowledge of the local area and often speak fluently in two languages or more. Using local guides and services brings many benefits to the protected area. In particular, it enables people to continue earning a living from the land and helps to ensure that the protected area remains protected.

Popular activities in the desert environment include 4x4 tours, camel rides, camping under the stars, riding Arabian horses, hiking and rock-climbing among the massive rock formations. Travelers staying in the area can overnight in Bedouins style Camps located in the desert or glamping hotels. Hikers and adventurous travelers may also opt to camp outdoors under the stars. Tour operators offering this experience provide sleeping equipment, meals and transport.

Dima and Lama Hattab coordinate an annual marathon in the region called Jabal Ishrin.

Rock climbing

Local Bedouin have climbed in the sandstone mountains of Wadi Rum for many generations. Many of their 'Bedouin Roads' have been rediscovered and documented by modern climbers. Several are included in the climbing guidebook by Tony Howard, and online by Liên and Gilles Rappeneau.

In 1949, Sheikh Hamdan took surveyors to the summit of Jabal Ram.  The first recorded European ascent of Jabal Ram took place in November 1952, by Charmian Longstaff and Sylvia Branford, guided by Sheik Hamdan.  The first recorded rock climbs started in 1984, with the first of many visits by English climbers Howard, Baker, Taylor and Shaw. This group repeated many of the Bedouin routes, accompanied by locals and independently, including, in 1984, Hammad's Route on Jebel Rum, and, in 1985, Sheikh Kraim’s Hunter’s Slabs and Rijm Assaf on Jebel Rum. Many new routes were climbed in the 1980s, by this team, French guide Wilfried Colonna, by the Swiss Remy brothers, and by Haupolter and Precht.  The first dedicated climbing guide book, Treks and Climb in Wadi Rum, by Tony Howard, was first published in 1987.  Some of the many Bedouin routes have been documented online by Lien and Gilles Rappeneau. A new routes book for climbers is held at the Wadi Rum Guest House.

The route Guerre Sainte was climbed in 2000 by Batoux, Petit and friends. This was the first route in Wadi Rum to be entirely equipped using bolt protection.

Inhabitants 
In the past, Wadi Rum has been inhabited by many civilizations. Currently, the majority is made up by the Zalabieh Bedouins who arrived to the region around 1980. The word "Bedouin" comes from the Arabic word for desert, pronounced badiya in the Arabic language. The root of this word is bad’a, which translates to "clear" and "obvious" in Arabic. One central characteristic for Bedouin tribes is the sense of belonging that tribe members feel.

When they first arrived, the Zalabieh bedouins lived in tents. Their village held about 700-800 people. 80% of those people were either retired from the army or the police.

The camel is the favorite animal of the Zalabieh bedouins. It is a symbol for male pride. Camel racing is an important sport for the Bedouins.  These races allow Bedouins to engage in male competition, and establish manhood and power within the community.

Filming location
The area has been used as a background setting in a number of films. Filmmakers are particularly drawn to it for science fiction films set on Mars.

The Location Managers Guild recognized the Jordanian Royal Film Commission with its LMGI Award for Outstanding Film Commission in 2017 for its work on Rogue One, which was filmed at Wadi Rum. The RFC was previously nominated for its work with The Martian.

 Lawrence of Arabia – David Lean filmed much of this 1962 film on location in Wadi Rum.
 Prometheus – scenes for the Alien Planet
 The Last Days on Mars – filmed for exterior shots representing the surface of the titular planet for this 2013 film. 
 The Martian – filming for the Ridley Scott film began in March 2015, for shots that stood in for the surface of Mars. Matt Damon on Wadi Rum:

 Theeb – Filmed mostly in Wadi Rum, as well as Wadi Araba.
 Rogue One: A Star Wars Story, used for scenes set on Jedha.
 Aladdin, 2019 live action remake of the 1992 Disney animated film of the same name.
 Star Wars: The Rise of Skywalker, used for the desert planet Pasaana.
 Dune (2021), used as a location for the desert planet Arrakis. Timothée Chalamet on Wadi Rum:
 Dune: Part Two, used as a location for filming the upcoming movie.
 Aadujeevitham – The desert scenes of the 2020 Malayalam film were mostly shot on locations in Wadi Rum.
 Moon Knight (2022), used for the scenes outside Ammit's tomb.
 The Amazing Race 34

Gallery

See also

 List of World Heritage Sites in Jordan
 Nature reserves in Jordan

References

External links

 Official website
 Photos of Wadi Rum, The American Center of Research
 Photos of Wadi Rum from the Manar al-Athar photo archive

Rum
Tourist attractions in Jordan 
Levant
Nature reserves in Jordan
World Heritage Sites in Jordan
Aqaba Governorate
Articles containing video clips
Nabataean sites in Jordan
Iram of the Pillars